This is a list of road/highway and rail crossings of the Raritan River from the mouth at Raritan Bay upstream. It also includes crossings of its two branches: the North Branch Raritan River and the South Branch Raritan River.

Crossings

See also
 
 
 

Bridges in New Jersey

R